Man Mohan Sharma FREng (born May 1, 1937 in Jodhpur, Rajasthan) is an Indian chemical engineer. He was educated at Jodhpur, Mumbai, and Cambridge. At age 27, he was appointed Professor of Chemical Engineering in the Institute of Chemical Technology, Mumbai. He later went on to become the Director of UDCT, the first chemical engineering professor to do so from UDCT.

In 1990, he became the first Indian engineer to be elected as a Fellow of Royal Society, UK. He was awarded the Padma Bhushan (1987) and the Padma Vibhushan (2001) by the President of India. he has also been awarded the Leverhulme Medal of the Royal Society, the S.S. Bhatnagar Prize in Engineering Sciences (1973), FICCI Award (1981), the Vishwakarma medal of the Indian National Science Academy (1985), G.M. Modi Award (1991), Meghnad Saha Medal (1994), and an honorary Doctor of Science degree from Indian Institute of Technology, Delhi (2001).

Education
Sharma obtained Bachelor of Chemical Engineering (1958) from UDCT and subsequently MSc (Tech) in 1960. He obtained PhD (Chemical Engineering) (1964) at Cambridge University with Peter Danckwerts. In 1964, he returned to India as Professor at the University of Bombay, and later became Director of the University Department of Chemical Technology (UDCT) (now the Institute of Chemical Technology). He served as Professor for 33 years at UDCT, along with 8 years as Director of this institute.

Academic career
Sharma made contributions to chemical engineering science and technology. His studies on Bronsted based catalysis in CO2 hydration (published in the Transactions of Faraday Society) and subsequently kinetics of COS absorption in aqueous amines and alkanolamines brought out linear free energy relationship between CO2 and COS absorption in solutions of amines and alkanolamines. He has contributed extensively on the role of microphases in multiple reactions which he pioneered. He also became an independent Editor of Chemical Engineering Science at a young age. He taught different subjects in chemical engineering and encouraged his doctoral students, from the very beginning, to publish independently their work in renowned journals.

Under his stewardship, UDCT was granted autonomy by the UGC and the Institute increased the number of PhD graduates.

Awards
Sharma is a recipient of a number of prestigious academic honours and awards including the 1977 Moulton Medal of the Institution of Chemical Engineers, and is himself commemorated in the M M Sharma Medal awarded by the same institution for outstanding research contributions.

He won the Leverhulme Medal of the Royal Society "for his work on the dynamics of multi-phase chemical reactions in industrial processes". He was awarded the Padma Vibhushan (in 2001), and Padma Bhushan (in 1987) by the President of India. He was INSA President (1989–90). He is a Fellow of the Indian Academy of Sciences, Bangalore, Honorary Fellow of the National Academy of Sciences (India), Allahabad, Fellow of the Royal Society, London. Subsequently, he was elected Honorary Fellow by the Royal Academy of Engineering and is Foreign Associate of the US National Academy of Engineering.

He has been honoured by several universities including IITs by honorary doctorates.

Further reading

References

External links

1937 births
Living people
Indian chemical engineers
Recipients of the Padma Vibhushan in science & engineering
Recipients of the Padma Bhushan in science & engineering
Rajasthani people
Fellows of the Royal Society
Engineers from Rajasthan
University of Mumbai alumni
Institute of Chemical Technology alumni
People from Jodhpur
Fellows of the Indian National Science Academy
Fellows of the Indian Academy of Sciences
20th-century Indian engineers
Fellows of The National Academy of Sciences, India
Foreign associates of the National Academy of Engineering
Recipients of the Shanti Swarup Bhatnagar Award in Engineering Science